Orsk is a city in Orenburg Oblast, Russia.

Orsk may also refer to:

 Orsk Airport, serving the city of Orsk
 Orsk Urban Okrug, the municipal division containing the city of Orsk
 Orsk constituency, Russian legislative constituency in Orenburg Oblast
 Orsk, Lower Silesian Voivodeship, a village in southwest Poland
 Orsk, an Alligator-class landing ship of Russia

See also